Charles M. Poston Sr. (February 14, 1898 – November 1968), was a Louisiana railroad employee who served in the Louisiana State Senate from 1960 to 1964

References

1898 births
1968 deaths
Democratic Party Louisiana state senators
People from Vernon Parish, Louisiana
20th-century American politicians